USS LST-572 was a United States Navy  used in the Asiatic-Pacific Theater during World War II.

Construction and commissioning
LST-572 was laid down on 15 April 1944 at Evansville, Indiana, by the Missouri Valley Bridge and Iron Company. She was launched on 29 May 1944, sponsored by Mrs. B. B. Dumville, and commissioned on 19 June 1944.

Service history
During the war, LST-572 was first assigned to the Europe-Africa-Middle East Theater as part of convoy HX 301, leaving New York City, 25 July 1944 and arriving in Liverpool, 8 August 1944.

On 24 December 1944, LST-572 left Guantanamo, Cuba, with Convoy GZ 111 and arrived in Cristóbal, Colónl, on 27 December 1944.

She was later reassigned to the Pacific Theater of Operations. She took part in the Battle of Okinawa in May and June 1945.
 
Following the war, LST-572 performed occupation duty in the Far East until early March 1946.

LST-572 was decommissioned on 8 March 1946 and transferred to the Military Sea Transportation Service on 31 March 1952 where she operated as USNS LST-572. She was struck from the Navy list on 15 June 1973 and sold on 19 November that same year to Yi Ho Enterprise Corp.

Honors and awards
LST-572 earned one battle stars for her World War II service.

Notes
Citations

Bibliography
Online sources

External links

LST-542-class tank landing ships
World War II amphibious warfare vessels of the United States
Ships built in Evansville, Indiana
1944 ships